Danuta Nycz is a Polish luger who competed in the early 1960s. She won the bronze medal in the women's singles event at the 1962 FIL World Luge Championships in Krynica, Poland.

References
Hickok sports information on World champions in luge and skeleton.
SportQuick.com information on World champions in luge 

Polish female lugers
Possibly living people
Year of birth missing
Place of birth missing (living people)